Huang Zhun (born 19 June 1926) is a Chinese composer. She studied in the Drama Department of Lu Xun Academy of Fine Arts, graduating in 1944, and studied composition with Xian Xinghai. She performed as a mezzo-soprano from 1941–42. She worked in the Dalian Art Work Group in 1946. Later, she worked in Northeast Film Studio and Beijing Film Studio, and then in 1949 took a position as a composer and later as a music director for Shanghai Film Studio where she worked until 1987. She has composed many films such as Long Live Youth and Red Detachment of Women.

Early life
Huang Zhun was born in Huangyan, Zhejiang. Her first composition was made in 1947 by the Northeast Film Studio for the first feature film in the Liberated Areas, "Leaving him to fight Lao Jiang". She also completed the theme song "The Army Loves the People, The People Love the Army" in 1948. This song became very popular in the northeast region of China. After that, she moved to work in Beijing Film Studio and Shanghai Film Studio as a composer, where she later wrote the musical score for dozens of films, such as Family and Woman Basketball Player No. 5. In particular, she composed the score for the film Red Detachment of Women. This work had a very big influence at the time. After this, her composition of the theme song "The Fishing Kittens" won the National Children's Song Award. She composed more than two hundred songs throughout her life, one of them, "The Teacher", won the first prize of the 2nd National Children's Song Award. Another, "Years Gone By", won the National Youth Favorite Song's third prize.

Honors and awards
20th Century Masterpiece of Chinese Music 1989 for Red Detachment of Women theme song
50th Anniversary of Chinese TV and Film Music Prize, 1999
The theme song "The Fishing Kittens" won the National Children's Song Award

Works
Huang Zhun has composed over forty film scores. Selected works include: 
Old Man and Nymph, 1956
Red Detachment of Women, 1960
Two Sisters on Stage, 1964
Special Task, 1978
Meeting Ceremony, 1980
Strange Marriage, 1981
Horsekeeper, 1982
Wrangler, 1982
Little Goldfish, 1982
The Last Choice, 1983
Deal Under the Noose, 1985
Gourmet, 1985
She has published books including:
Selected Songs of Huang Zhun
Life and Melodies
Music and My Life

References

1926 births
Living people
20th-century classical composers
Chinese music educators
Chinese women classical composers
People's Republic of China composers
Musicians from Zhejiang
Educators from Taizhou, Zhejiang
Chinese classical composers
Women music educators
20th-century women composers